Fudbalski klub Željezničar Sarajevo (English: Football Club Željezničar Sarajevo) is a professional football club based in Sarajevo, Bosnia and Herzegovina.

This is a list of all the players that have played for the club since its foundation, in 1921.

Only players that have played at least one match in any of the following competitions: domestic league, domestic cup and European competitions.

Players that only played in friendlies, tournaments and that were on trial are not included.



A
 Adi Adilović
 Eldin Adilović
 Admir Adžem
 Mirzet Alagić
 Veljko Aleksić
 Anel Alibašić
 Haris Alihodžić
 Mehmed Alispahić
 Zablon Amanaka 
 Marijan Antolović
 Ensar Arifović
 Arben Avdija

B
 Delimir Bajić
 Riad Bajić
 Alen Bajkuša
 Zdenko Baotić
 Kenan Bećirović
 Samir Bekrić
 Haris Bešlija
 Mirsad Bešlija
 Bulend Biščević
 Dragan Bočeski
 Jadranko Bogičević
 Jovan Blagojević
 Matteo Boccaccini 
 Sead Bučan
 Semir Bukvić
 Kemal Buljubašić
 Rusmir Burek

C
 Edin Cocalić
 Rusmir Cviko

Č
 Benjamin Čolić
 Elvir Čolić
 Almir Čosić

Ć
 Aldin Ćenan
 Milan Ćulum

D
 Boubacar Dialiba
  Marijo Dodik
 Dejan Drakul
 Feđa Dudić
 Edin Dudo

DŽ
 Edin Džeko (played at 2014 FIFA World Cup)

Đ
 Ognjen Đelmić

E
 Faris Efendić
 Kemal Elkaz

F
 Nermin Fatić
 Adnan Fočić

G
 Sahmir Garčević
 Goran Gančev
 Nudžein Geca
 Patrick Nyema Gerhardt
  Anto Grabo 
 Branko Grahovac
 Almir Gredić
 Adnan Gušo
 Milan Gutović
 Jure Guvo

H
 Emir Hadžić
 Sead Halilagić
 Kenan Hasagić
 Armin Hodžić
 Vlado Hrkać
 Ivica Huljev

I
 Faruk Ihtijarević

J
 Samir Jahić
 Sanel Jahić
 Adis Jahović
 Nermin Jamak
 Omer Joldić
 Nedim Jusufbegović
 Aleksandar Jovanović

K
 Admir Kajtaz
 Đorđe Kamber
 Sead Kapetanović
 Denis Karić
 Elvis Karić
 Suad Katana
 Zoran Kokot
 Miroslav Kružik
 Elmir Kuduzović
 Edin Kunić
 Alen Kurt
 Josip Kvesić

L
 Ivan Lendrić
 Galib Lulo

M
 Armin Mahović
 Vladimir Markotić
 Goran Marković
 Vladimir Marković
 Amar Mehić
 Samir Mekić
 Kerim Memija
 Jasmin Memišević
 Alen Mešanović 
 Elvis Mešić
 Mirza Mešić
 Sanjin Mešić
 Nenad Mišković
 Denis Mudrinić
 Dino Muharemović
 Dželaludin Muharemović
 Edis Mulalić
 Adin Mulaosmanović
 Samir Muratović
 Adi Musli

N
 Aleksandar Nikolić

O
 Adis Obad
 Amar Osim

P
 Šaban Pehilj
 Adnan Pehlivanović
 Albin Pelak
 Sanjin Pintul
 Lazar Popović
 Arsim Prepoli

R
 Sanjin Radonja
 Božidar Radošević
 Igor Radovanović
 Mirko Radovanović
 Mileta Radulović
 Aleksandar Railić
 Admir Raščić
 Haris Redžepi
 Damir Rovčanin

S
 Srđan Savić
 Sead Seferović
 Mersad Selimbegović
 Nedžad Serdarević
 Mensur Sinanović
 Ilija Simić
 Dragutin Simić
 Ervin Smailagić
 Bajro Spahić 
 Perica Stančeski
 Mario Stanić
  Srđan Stanić
  Siniša Stevanović
  Joco Stokić

Š
 Nermin Šabić
 Eldar Šehić
 Ibrahim Šehić
 Branko Šešlija
 Dalibor Šilić
 Predrag Šimić
 Edin Šopović
 Semir Štilić

T
 Sergej Tica
 Tomislav Tomić
 Nedo Turković

U
 Yani Urdinov
 Božidar Urošević
 Dejan Uzelac

V
 Juan Manuel Varea
 Nermin Vazda
 Edin Višća (played at 2014 FIFA World Cup)
 Admir Vladavić
 Lillo Vojtović
 Avdija Vršajević (played at 2014 FIFA World Cup)
 Muamer Vugdalić
 Sretko Vuksanović

W
 Neil Wood

Z
 Zajko Zeba
 Mirza Zekić
 Mladen Zeljković
 Hadis Zubanović

Ž
 Fadil Žerić
 Senad Žerić
 Denis Žerić

Yugoslav period

A
 Kemal Alispahić
 Senad Arnautović
 Siniša Aškraba
 Šefik Azabagić

B
 Edin Bahtić
 Duško Bajić
 Šener Bajramović
 Mirsad Baljić
 Mehmed Baždarević
 Velija Bećirspahić
 Branislav Berjan
 Željko Biljuš
 Rade Bogdanović
 Boris Bračulj
 Blagoje Bratić
 Ivan Brzić
 Josip Bukal
 Risto Bukvić
 Ivica Baskarada

C
 Ivan Cvitanušić

Č
 Vlado Čapljić
 Josip Čilić

Ć
 Edin Ćurić

D
 Nedim Dautović
 Avdija Deraković
 Dimitrije Dimitrijević
 Hamo Dizdarević
 Zvonko Duspara

Đ
 Mustafa Đelilović
 Petar Đorđević
 Hajrudin Đurbuzović
 Ranko Đorđić
 Vidoje Đorđić

F
 Fahor Fazlagić

G
 Mirko Gašić
 Milan Gavrilović
 Anto Grabo
 Emir Grčić
 Goran Gutalj
 Milan Gutović

H
 Enver Hadžiabdić
 Edim Hadžialagić
 Tarik Hodžić
 Fahrija Hrvat

I
 Esad Ibrahimović
 Stojanče Idić
 Srećko Ilić
 Duško Ivanović

J
 Slobodan Janjuš 
 Božo Janković
 Branimir Jelušić
 Dušan Jovanović
 Marjan Jugović

K
 Nusret Kadrić
 Ljubo Kalaba
 Josip Katalinski
 Rudolf Kinčić
 Dragan Kojović
 Slobodan Kojović
 Vladimir Kojović
 Kasim Kokot
 Vlatko Konjevod
 Stevica Krsmanović
 Simo Krunić
 Sulejman Kulović

L
 Lazar Lemić
 Franjo Lovrić
 Ivan Lušić

M
 Slavko Mamuzić
 Rade Matić
 Zoran Matković
 Almir Memić
 Radmilo Mihajlović
 Vitomir Milošević
 Fikret Mujkić
 Midhat Mujkić

N
 Nikola Nikić
 Siniša Nikolić

O
 Milomir Odović
 Nedžad Omerhodžić
 Ivica Osim

P
 Rade Paprica
 Zoran Paprica
 Ilijas Pašić
 Željko Pavlović
 Ivica Pekić
 Ranko Planinić
 Dragan Popadić
 Neđo Prelo

R
 Vladan Radača
 Ivan Radić
 Miloš Radović
 Vasilije Radović
 Milan Ribar
 Željko Rodić

S
 Hajrudin Saračević
 Dušan Simić
 Zoran Slišković
 Drago Smajlović
 Đuro Smajlović
 Zoran Samardžija
 Edin Sprečo

Š
 Refik Šabanadžović
 Džemaludin Šerbo
 Josip Šimović
 Haris Škoro
 Dragan Škrba
 Miljan Štaka
 Slobodan Šujica

T
 Ilija Tojagić

V
 Jasminko Velić
 Nedžad Verlašević
  Gordan Vidović
 Dragomir Vlaški

Z
 Anto Zečević
 Josip Zemko

Ž
 Marcel Žigante

External links
FK Željezničar Sarajevo A-Z players at Worldfootball

Manager
FK Zelj
Željezničar
Association football player non-biographical articles